"Girls" is a song by British singer Rita Ora, featuring American rapper Cardi B, American singer Bebe Rexha and British singer Charli XCX. The single was released on 11 May 2018 by Atlantic Records. It was written by Ora, Rexha, Cardi B, Klenord Raphael, Ali Tamposi, Pardison Fontaine, Brian Lee, and producers Jonny Coffer, Watt, and Ben Billions .

Background 
The collaboration was announced on 4 May 2018. Rita Ora described the song as an "empowering anthem":

In an interview with People, Ora revealed that the song was inspired by Katy Perry's "I Kissed a Girl", which she described as: "just such a statement; it was so fun".

Composition
"Girls" is a pop song that comprises a hip hop-influenced beat. The lyrics explore themes of same-sex attraction.

Music video
The music video for "Girls" was released on 6 June 2018. It was directed by Helmi.

Live performances
Ora performed the song live for the first time at BBC Radio 1's Big Weekend on 28 May 2017, with Charli XCX and Raye, one year before its release as an official single. Her first televised performance was on the season finale of Germany's Next Topmodel on 24 May 2018.

Reception
American singers Hayley Kiyoko and Kehlani, both of whom identify as lesbians, criticized the song for being "harmful" to the LGBTQ community. Kiyoko referred to the song in a tweet she posted as being "tone-deaf", stating that the song "fueled the male gaze while marginalizing the idea of women loving women." Kehlani voiced her opinion in a series of tweets, "I have an incredible song out with one of the artists, and would love to work with the other three as well. I have met them all and respect them. There. Were. Harmful. Lyrics." She concluded her tweets with: "Every artist on the song is fantastic, and very much loved and supported by me... by all of us. But this isn't about talent, it's about choice."

In 2019, Billboard included the song in its list of the "30 Lesbian Love Songs".

Singers' responses to backlash
Ora responded to criticism, as she wrote: "'Girls' was written to represent my truth and is an accurate account of a very real and honest experience in my life... I have had romantic relationships with women and men throughout my life and this is my personal journey". Nonetheless, she apologized following the controversy.

Cardi insisted on Twitter that she and the others "never [tried] to cause harm or had bad intentions with the song", referencing her own bisexuality and prior experiences with women. Charli stated in an interview with Rolling Stone that she had read the criticisms, including Kiyoko and Kehlani's posts, regarding the song's lyrics, continuing: "... the intention of the song was never to hurt anybody. None of the artists on this song would ever want to upset or hurt anyone." She further mentioned that she wants to "learn from this experience" and hoped to continue dialogue without upsetting queer communities.

Rexha opted for a more defensive response, telling Entertainment Weekly, "My sexual life is nobody's business... but we're singing a song about kissing girls and that remains true to who I am. It's the life that I live and it's honest to me." She went on to say "People automatically went for the negative instead of saying: 'Well maybe these girls do kiss girls, maybe Bebe is bi.' You don't know about my sexual orientation, so I felt disrespected."

Track listing
Digital download
"Girls" (featuring Cardi B, Bebe Rexha and Charli XCX) – 3:41

Digital download
"Girls" (featuring Cardi B, Bebe Rexha and Charli XCX) (Martin Jensen Remix) – 4:20

Digital download
"Girls" (featuring Cardi B, Bebe Rexha and Charli XCX) (Steve Aoki Remix) – 3:45

Charts

Certifications

Release history

References

External links

2018 singles
2018 songs
Atlantic Records singles
Bebe Rexha songs
Cardi B songs
Charli XCX songs
Rita Ora songs
Songs written by Rita Ora
Songs written by Cardi B
Songs written by Andrew Watt (record producer)
Songs written by Ali Tamposi
Songs written by Jonny Coffer
Songs written by Brian Lee (songwriter)
Songs written by Ben Billions
Songs written by Klenord Raphael
Songs written by Bebe Rexha
Lesbian-related songs
LGBT-related controversies in music